Dumitru Dediu (12 May 1942 in Galaţi – July 2013) was a pilot in the Romanian Air Force and cosmonaut candidate that was assigned as the backup for Dumitru Prunariu.

Information
In 1978, Dediu was selected as the backup for Dumitru Prunariu for the Soyuz 40 mission. He served in the Romanian Army and lived in Bucharest.
He died in early July 2013 after a serious illness (Alzheimer's and Parkinson's). He was buried on July 11, 2013.

References

1942 births
2013 deaths
People from Galați
Romanian Air Force officers
Romanian cosmonauts